Nenagh Éire Óg GAA is a Tipperary GAA club which is located in County Tipperary, Ireland. Both hurling and Gaelic football are played in the "North-Tipperary" divisional competitions. The club is centred on the town of Nenagh.

Honours
Tipperary Senior Football Championship Winners in 1911 and 1915 (Nenagh Institute)

Tipperary Senior Hurling Championship winners in 1995

Munster Senior Club Hurling Championship finalists in 1995 where they were beaten by Sixmilebridge.

Roll of Honour
Divisional Championships – 180 titles
 North Tipperary Senior Hurling Championship (10) 1915, 1957, 1964, 1992, 1993, 1998, 2001, 2009, 2014, 2022
 North Tipperary Under-21 A Hurling Championship(7) 1979, 1980, 1981, 1982, 1993, 1994, 2015
 North Tipperary Minor A Hurling Championship (21) 1938, 1947 (as St. Mary's), 1948 (as St. Mary's), 1949 (as St. Mary's), 1951 (as St. Mary's), 1953, 1955, 1969, 1977, 1978, 1979, 1989, 1991, 1992, 2007, 2008, 2009, 2010, 2011, 2012, 2013
 North Intermediate Hurling Championship (1) 1947 (as St. Mary's)
North Tipperary Junior A Hurling Championship (7) 1983, 1999, 2000, 2009, 2012, 2014, 2021
North Tipperary Junior B Hurling Championship (1) 1994
North Tipperary Junior C Hurling Championship (2) 2010, 2020
 North Tipperary Senior Football Championship (6) 1989, 1991, 1992, 1994, 1995, 1998
 North Intermediate Football Championship (4) 1974, 1988, 1996, 1997
North Tipperary Junior A Football Championship (5) 1962, 1974, 1985, 1986, 2010
 North Tipperary Junior B Football Championship (1) 2021
 North Tipperary Under 21 A Football Championship (12) 1981, 1983, 1984, 1987, 1988, 1989, 1990, 1991, 1992, 1993, 1994, 2009
North Tipperary Under 19 B Football Championship (1) 2022
North Tipperary Minor A Football Championship (11) 1977, 1983, 1986, 1988, 1989, 1990, 1991, 1992, 1993, 1994, 2012
North Tipperary Under-17 Hurling Championship (1) 2021, 2022
 North Tipperary Under-16 Hurling Championship (16) 1972, 1975, 1979, 1982, 1988, 1990, 1992, 2005, 2007, 2008, 2009, 2010, 2011, 2012, 2015, 2017
 North Tipperary Under-15 Hurling Championship (3) 1968, 1969, 1970
 North Tipperary Under-14 Hurling Championship (12) 1972, 73, 74, 78, 88, 96, 2003, 2005, 2009, 2010, 2011, 2019
 North Tipperary Under-13 Hurling Championship (3) 1966, 1967, 1970
 North Tipperary Under-12 Hurling Championship(8) 1972, 1984, 2001, 2002, 2003, 2007, 2011, 2013
 North Tipperary Under-12C Hurling Championship (2) 2004, 2005
 North Tipperary Under-16 Football Championship (14) 1973, 1975, 1979, 1985, 1987, 1988, 1989, 1990, 1994, 1995, 2005, 2006, 2009, 2012
 North Tipperary Under-14 Football Championship(16) 1971, 1972, 1973, 1974, 1978, 1979, 1986, 1987, 1988, 1992, 2001, 2003, 2005, 2007, 2013, 2019
 North Tipperary Under-12 Football Championship (20) 1971, 1972, 1973, 1974, 1976, 1984, 1985, 1986, 1987, 1988, 1989, 1990, 1991, 1994, 1999, 2003, 2005, 2007, 2017, 2019

County Titles – 47 titles
 Tipperary Senior Football Championship (2) 1911, 1915 (Nenagh Institute)
 Tipperary Senior Hurling Championship (1) 1995
 Tipperary Intermediate Football Championship (2) 1988, 1997
 Tipperary Intermediate Hurling Championship (1) 1947 (St Mary's)
Tipperary Junior A Hurling Championship (3) 1947, 1983, 2000
Tipperary Junior A Football Championship (1) 1986, 2010
 Tipperary Junior B Football Championship (1) 2021
Tipperary Under-21 A Hurling Championship (5) 1979, 1980, 1981, 1982, 1993
 Tipperary Under-21 A Football Championship (2) 1991, 1993
 Tipperary Minor A Hurling Championship (8) 1969, 1977, 1978, 1991, 1992, 2008, 2012, 2013
 Tipperary Minor A Football Championship (1) 1990
 Tipperary Under-16 Hurling Championship (5) 1975, 1979, 1982, 1988, 1990
 Tipperary Under-14 Hurling Championship (7) 1972, 1973, 1974, 1988, 2003, 2009, 2010
 Tipperary Under-16 Football Championship(2) 1988, 1990
 Tipperary Under-14 Football Championship (1) 1986
 Tipperary Under-12 Football Championship (3) 1972, 1984, 1990
 Tipperary Under 10 1/2 Hurling Championship (3) 2002, 2006, 2007

All-Ireland Titles – 3 titles
All Ireland 7 a side champions 1998, 2008
All Ireland Community games champions 2018

Club Players who have won All Ireland medals
Senior Hurling
John McGrath 1958
Mick Burns 1958, 1961, 1962, 1964, 1965
Michael Cleary 1989, 1991
Conor O'Donovan 1989, 1991
John Heffernan 1989
Hugh Maloney 2010
Michael Heffernan 2010
Barry Heffernan 2016
Daire Quinn 2016
Barry Heffernan 2019
Jake Morris 2019

In addition Michael Cleary also won four consecutive All-Stars between 1990 and 1993.

Under 20/21 Hurling
Roger Coffey 1979, 1980
Brian Heffernan 1979, 1980, 1981
Michael Kennedy 1980
Philip Kennedy 1980, 1981
PJ Maxwell 1980
Jim O Sullivan 1981
John Flannery 1985
Declan O Meara 1995
Kevin Tucker 1995
Michael Heffernan 2010
Paddy Murphy 2010
Shane Hennessy 2018
Jake Morris 2018, 2019
Conor McCarthy 2019

Minor Hurling
John McGrath 1949
Paddy Hallinan 1953
Mick Burns 1955
Michael Gilmartin 1955
Anthony Tierney 1956
Devere Reynolds 1956, 1957
Phil Hennessy 1957
Paddy Kearns 1957
Paudie Kennedy 1957
Michael Griffin 1976
Dennis Finnerty 1980
John Flannery 1982
Michael Heffernan 2006, 2007
Patrick Murphy 2007
Barry Heffernan 2012
Killian Gleeson 2012
Jake Morris 2016

Intermediate Hurling
Paddy Hallinan 1963
Michael Kearns 1963
Michael Heffernan 2012

Junior Football
Chris Bonnar 1998
Kevin Coonan 1998
Jim McAuliffe 1998

North Tipperary – Hurlers' of the Year
Conor O'Donovan 1987 SH
Michael Cleary 1989 SH
Kevin Tucker 1993 SH
Eddie Tucker 1995 SH
John Heffernan 2001 JH
Hugh Moloney 2004 SH, 2007 SH
Michael Heffernan 2007 MH
Niall Madden 2011 JH
Donnacha Quinn 2012, 2013 MH
Daire Quinn 2014 SH
Alan Kelly 2014 JH

North Tipperary – Footballers' of the Year
Kevin O Carroll 1988
Michael Kennedy 1989
Mark Sheahan 1991
Kevin Coonan 1992, 1998
Richie Flannery 2004
Lenny Ryan 2005
Paul O'Leary 2011, 2012

External links
Official Nenagh Éire Og GAA Club website
Tipperary GAA site
Tipperary GAA club sites
Tipperary on Hoganstand.com

Gaelic games clubs in County Tipperary
Hurling clubs in County Tipperary
Gaelic football clubs in County Tipperary
Nenagh